Alexander Champion may refer to:

 Alexander Champion (East India Company officer) (died 1793), Commander-in-Chief, India, 1774
 Alexander Champion (snr) (died 1795), London based merchant
 Alexander Champion (businessman) (1751–1809), his son, London based merchant and whaler